Kohali is a village of union council 47-GB of samundri of Faisalabad District in the Punjab province of Pakistan. It is part of samundri, and located at latitude 31° 7'45.50"N and longitude  72°47'56.72"E with an altitude of 563 feet. It was very rich and historical village before independence.10 to 15% people working abroad, mostly in France, America, UK, UAE, KSA. There are four mosques and one Imambargah in the village. More influential tribes and clans  are Rajput, Jat, Arian, kamboh, etc. Main occupation of the people are cultivation.

The main crops that are cultivated in this village are sugar cane, wheat Cotton and the land of this village is watered from the branch canal of the Gugera Branch Canal which is a branch of Lower Chenab Canal. Rana Shamshad ali khan is the biggest land owner from this village. Most of the under water is sour. More than 70% population of this village is connected directly and indirectly with cultivation. Literacy rate is very good comparatively, Four schools at per record (2 Gov+2 Private) and several people from this village are working at outstanding positions in various industries including doctors, engineers and finance sector, several in Pakistan Army at very senior positions.

References

External links
 https://web.archive.org/web/20120326133048/http://www.nrb.gov.pk/lg_election/union.asp?district=8&dn=Faisalabad

Villages in Faisalabad District